The 1997–98 Heineken Cup was the third edition of the Heineken Cup European rugby union club competition. Competing professional club teams from France, Ireland, Italy, Wales, England and Scotland, were divided into five pools of four, in which teams played home and away matches against each other. The pool winners automatically qualified for the knock-out stages. The five runners-up and the best third placed team entered the play-offs, where they competed for the remaining three quarter final positions.

Teams

Pool stage
In the pool matches teams received
 2 points for a win
 1 points for a draw

Pool 1

Pool 2

Pool 3

Pool 4

Pool 5

Seeding

Knockout stage

Quarter-final play-offs

Quarter-finals

Semi-finals

Brive advance to final on try count (two tries to one)

Final

References

 
1997–98 in English rugby union
1997–98 in French rugby union
1997–98 in Irish rugby union
1997–98 in Italian rugby union
1997–98 in Scottish rugby union
1997–98 in Welsh rugby union
1996-97
1997–98 in European rugby union